Esquel Group is a Hong Kong-based textile and apparel manufacturer. It is the world's largest woven shirt maker, producing about 100 million shirts annually. Esquel supplies textile to companies such as  Li Ning, ANTA Sports, Fila, Giordano, Muji.

History
The family owned business was founded in 1978 by family patriarch . The opening of China that year had according to one of Yang's daughters led to the decision to establish the company.

U.S. sanctions 

In July 2020, the United States Department of Commerce placed a Hong Kong-based subsidiary of Esquel Group on the Bureau of Industry and Security's Entity List for alleged use of forced labor of Uyghurs in Xinjiang. In July 2021, Esquel filed a lawsuit in the United States District Court for the District of Columbia against the U.S. government seeking removal from the Entity List. In August 2021, Esquel was removed, with conditions, from the Entity List by the inter-agency End-User Review Committee, which is composed of representatives from the U.S. Departments of Commerce, State, Defense, Energy, and Treasury. Several weeks later, Esquel resumed its lawsuit after failing to reach an agreement with the U.S. Commerce Department regarding the timetable for removal and the specifics of the conditions for removal.

Facilities
Most of the company's manufacturing facilities are in China.

Its operations in China like the rest of the textile industry in China have faced the constant pressure of rising labor costs and stricter environmental regulation. The company has strategy of upgrading or opening new facilities with better automation to counter the competitive pressure of rising wages. This strategy was noted by the South China Morning Post as different from some other competitors which sought to diversify operations by moving to other countries with lower labor costs.

References

Textile companies of Hong Kong
1978 establishments in Hong Kong